Mozzecane is a comune (municipality) in the Province of Verona in the Italian region Veneto, located about  west of Venice and about  southwest of Verona.

The municipality of Mozzecane contains the frazioni (subdivisions, mainly villages and hamlets) Grezzano, Quistello, San Zeno, and Tormine.

Mozzecane borders the following municipalities: Nogarole Rocca, Povegliano Veronese, Roverbella, Valeggio sul Mincio, and Villafranca di Verona.

Demographic evolution

References

Cities and towns in Veneto